Beverley Binda is a British make-up artist. She was nominated for an Academy Award in the category Best Makeup and Hairstyling for the film Mrs Brown.

Selected filmography 
 Mrs Brown (1997; co-nominated with Lisa Westcott and Veronica Brebner)

References

External links 

Living people
Year of birth missing (living people)
Place of birth missing (living people)
British make-up artists